Hala Mistrzów (polish: Hall of Champions) is an arena in Włocławek, Poland.  It is primarily used for basketball. Hala Mistrzow holds 4,200 people and hosts the home games of Anwil Włocławek.

Indoor arenas in Poland
Buildings and structures in Włocławek
Sports venues in Kuyavian-Pomeranian Voivodeship
Basketball venues in Poland